Titania (minor planet designation: 593 Titania) is a minor planet orbiting the Sun.
The name may have been inspired by the asteroid's provisional designation 1906 TT.

References

External links
 
 

Background asteroids
Titania
Titania
C-type asteroids (Tholen)
19060320